Roccaforte Ligure is a comune (municipality) in the Province of Alessandria in the Italian region Piedmont, located about  southeast of Turin and about  southeast of Alessandria, between the Val Sisola and the Valle Spinti.

Roccaforte Ligure borders the following municipalities: Borghetto di Borbera, Cantalupo Ligure, Grondona, Isola del Cantone, Mongiardino Ligure, and Rocchetta Ligure.

References

Cities and towns in Piedmont